R. Mathivanan is an Indian politician and former Member of the Legislative Assembly of Tamil Nadu. He was elected to the Tamil Nadu legislative assembly from Royapuram constituency as a Dravida Munnetra Kazhagam candidate in the 1989 and 1996 elections.

References 

Living people
Dravida Munnetra Kazhagam politicians
Tamil Nadu MLAs 1996–2001
Year of birth missing (living people)